Pəlikəş (also, Palikesh, Palikyash, and Palokyat) is a village and municipality in the Astara Rayon of Azerbaijan.  It has a population of 1,587.

References 

Populated places in Astara District